Ondatralaelaps is a genus of mites in the family Laelapidae.

Species
 Ondatralaelaps multispinosus (Banks)

References

Laelapidae